The Amur Constituency (No. 71) is a Russian legislative constituency covering the entirety of Amur Oblast.

Members elected

Election results

1993

|-
! colspan=2 style="background-color:#E9E9E9;text-align:left;vertical-align:top;" |Candidate
! style="background-color:#E9E9E9;text-align:left;vertical-align:top;" |Party
! style="background-color:#E9E9E9;text-align:right;" |Votes
! style="background-color:#E9E9E9;text-align:right;" |%
|-
|style="background-color:#EA3C38"|
|align=left|Andrey Zakharov
|align=left|Civic Union
|
|32.42%
|-
|style="background-color:"|
|align=left|Nikolay Kolyadinsky
|align=left|Independent
| -
|28.65%
|-
| colspan="5" style="background-color:#E9E9E9;"|
|- style="font-weight:bold"
| colspan="3" style="text-align:left;" | Total
| 
| 100%
|-
| colspan="5" style="background-color:#E9E9E9;"|
|- style="font-weight:bold"
| colspan="4" |Source:
|
|}

1995

|-
! colspan=2 style="background-color:#E9E9E9;text-align:left;vertical-align:top;" |Candidate
! style="background-color:#E9E9E9;text-align:left;vertical-align:top;" |Party
! style="background-color:#E9E9E9;text-align:right;" |Votes
! style="background-color:#E9E9E9;text-align:right;" |%
|-
|style="background-color:"|
|align=left|Leonid Korotkov
|align=left|Independent
|
|39.21%
|-
|style="background-color:#C28314"|
|align=left|Valery Voshchevoz
|align=left|For the Motherland!
|
|15.00%
|-
|style="background-color:"|
|align=left|Andrey Zakharov (incumbent)
|align=left|Independent
|
|9.27%
|-
|style="background-color:#23238E"|
|align=left|Svetlana Ponosova
|align=left|Our Home – Russia
|
|6.75%
|-
|style="background-color:"|
|align=left|Yury Semenov
|align=left|Liberal Democratic Party
|
|5.62%
|-
|style="background-color:"|
|align=left|Oleg Morar
|align=left|Independent
|
|5.34%
|-
|style="background-color:"|
|align=left|Nikolay Sheludko
|align=left|Independent
|
|3.22%
|-
|style="background-color:"|
|align=left|Leonid Dudchenko
|align=left|Independent
|
|2.42%
|-
|style="background-color:"|
|align=left|Viktor Peskovets
|align=left|Independent
|
|2.36%
|-
|style="background-color:#000000"|
|colspan=2 |against all
|
|9.79%
|-
| colspan="5" style="background-color:#E9E9E9;"|
|- style="font-weight:bold"
| colspan="3" style="text-align:left;" | Total
| 
| 100%
|-
| colspan="5" style="background-color:#E9E9E9;"|
|- style="font-weight:bold"
| colspan="4" |Source:
|
|}

1999

|-
! colspan=2 style="background-color:#E9E9E9;text-align:left;vertical-align:top;" |Candidate
! style="background-color:#E9E9E9;text-align:left;vertical-align:top;" |Party
! style="background-color:#E9E9E9;text-align:right;" |Votes
! style="background-color:#E9E9E9;text-align:right;" |%
|-
|style="background-color:"|
|align=left|Leonid Korotkov (incumbent)
|align=left|Independent
|
|16.76%
|-
|style="background-color:"|
|align=left|Gennady Gamza
|align=left|Communist Party
|
|14.95%
|-
|style="background-color:"|
|align=left|Galina Buslova
|align=left|Independent
|
|10.02%
|-
|style="background-color:"|
|align=left|Vladimir Dorovskikh
|align=left|Independent
|
|8.42%
|-
|style="background-color:"|
|align=left|Konstantin Gunbin
|align=left|Independent
|
|7.25%
|-
|style="background-color:"|
|align=left|Aleksandr Vinidiktov
|align=left|Independent
|
|6.33%
|-
|style="background-color:"|
|align=left|Lyubov Khashcheva
|align=left|Yabloko
|
|6.01%
|-
|style="background-color:"|
|align=left|Andrey Lushchey
|align=left|Independent
|
|5.50%
|-
|style="background-color:"|
|align=left|Aleksandr Bondar
|align=left|Independent
|
|4.95%
|-
|style="background-color:"|
|align=left|Sergey Lopatkin
|align=left|Independent
|
|2.87%
|-
|style="background-color:"|
|align=left|Andrey Guk
|align=left|Independent
|
|1.24%
|-
|style="background-color:#000000"|
|colspan=2 |against all
|
|14.08%
|-
| colspan="5" style="background-color:#E9E9E9;"|
|- style="font-weight:bold"
| colspan="3" style="text-align:left;" | Total
| 
| 100%
|-
| colspan="5" style="background-color:#E9E9E9;"|
|- style="font-weight:bold"
| colspan="4" |Source:
|
|}

2001

|-
! colspan=2 style="background-color:#E9E9E9;text-align:left;vertical-align:top;" |Candidate
! style="background-color:#E9E9E9;text-align:left;vertical-align:top;" |Party
! style="background-color:#E9E9E9;text-align:right;" |Votes
! style="background-color:#E9E9E9;text-align:right;" |%
|-
|style="background-color:"|
|align=left|Aleksandr Vinidiktov
|align=left|Independent
|
|27.47%
|-
|style="background-color:"|
|align=left|Dmitry Novikov
|align=left|Independent
|
|27.30%
|-
|style="background-color:"|
|align=left|Ivan Ryazhskikh
|align=left|Independent
|
|12.15%
|-
|style="background-color:"|
|align=left|Sergey Semenov
|align=left|Independent
|
|12.08%
|-
|style="background-color:"|
|align=left|Aleksandr Fokin
|align=left|Independent
|
|6.93%
|-
|style="background-color:#000000"|
|colspan=2 |against all
|
|12.03%
|-
| colspan="5" style="background-color:#E9E9E9;"|
|- style="font-weight:bold"
| colspan="3" style="text-align:left;" | Total
| 
| 100%
|-
| colspan="5" style="background-color:#E9E9E9;"|
|- style="font-weight:bold"
| colspan="4" |Source:
|
|}

2003

|-
! colspan=2 style="background-color:#E9E9E9;text-align:left;vertical-align:top;" |Candidate
! style="background-color:#E9E9E9;text-align:left;vertical-align:top;" |Party
! style="background-color:#E9E9E9;text-align:right;" |Votes
! style="background-color:#E9E9E9;text-align:right;" |%
|-
|style="background-color:"|
|align=left|Boris Vinogradov
|align=left|Independent
|
|22.16%
|-
|style="background-color:"|
|align=left|Vladimir Lysenko
|align=left|Independent
|
|13.60%
|-
|style="background-color:"|
|align=left|Aleksandr Vinidiktov (incumbent)
|align=left|Independent
|
|13.16%
|-
|style="background-color:"|
|align=left|Anatoly Belonogov
|align=left|Agrarian Party
|
|12.44%
|-
|style="background-color:"|
|align=left|Gennady Gamza
|align=left|Communist Party
|
|10.96%
|-
|style="background-color:#7C73CC"|
|align=left|Oksana Bulat
|align=left|Great Russia–Eurasian Union
|
|2.90%
|-
|style="background-color:"|
|align=left|Irina Zubova
|align=left|People's Party
|
|2.82%
|-
|style="background-color:#C21022"|
|align=left|Gennady Petrov
|align=left|Russian Pensioners' Party-Party of Social Justice
|
|2.25%
|-
|style="background-color:#00A1FF"|
|align=left|Ivan Ryazhskikh
|align=left|Party of Russia's Rebirth-Russian Party of Life
|
|2.21%
|-
|style="background-color:"|
|align=left|Aleksandr Naydenov
|align=left|Yabloko
|
|1.99%
|-
|style="background-color:#1042A5"|
|align=left|Sergey Derkach
|align=left|Union of Right Forces
|
|1.40%
|-
|style="background-color:"|
|align=left|Aleksandr Kuzmin
|align=left|Independent
|
|0.71%
|-
|style="background-color:#000000"|
|colspan=2 |against all
|
|9.10%
|-
| colspan="5" style="background-color:#E9E9E9;"|
|- style="font-weight:bold"
| colspan="3" style="text-align:left;" | Total
| 
| 100%
|-
| colspan="5" style="background-color:#E9E9E9;"|
|- style="font-weight:bold"
| colspan="4" |Source:
|
|}

2016

|-
! colspan=2 style="background-color:#E9E9E9;text-align:left;vertical-align:top;" |Candidate
! style="background-color:#E9E9E9;text-align:left;vertical-align:top;" |Party
! style="background-color:#E9E9E9;text-align:right;" |Votes
! style="background-color:#E9E9E9;text-align:right;" |%
|-
|style="background-color:"|
|align=left|Ivan Abramov
|align=left|Liberal Democratic Party
|
|45.98%
|-
|style="background-color:"|
|align=left|Roman Kobyzov
|align=left|Communist Party
|
|17.30%
|-
|style="background-color:"|
|align=left|Kirill Zimin
|align=left|A Just Russia
|
|9.99%
|-
|style="background-color:"|
|align=left|Yevgeny Volkov
|align=left|Communists of Russia
|
|6.81%
|-
|style="background-color:"|
|align=left|Natalya Kalinina
|align=left|Yabloko
|
|4.83%
|-
|style="background-color:"|
|align=left|Roman Barilo
|align=left|Rodina
|
|4.61%
|-
|style="background: "| 
|align=left|Valery Parshinkov
|align=left|The Greens
|
|4.07%
|-
| colspan="5" style="background-color:#E9E9E9;"|
|- style="font-weight:bold"
| colspan="3" style="text-align:left;" | Total
| 
| 100%
|-
| colspan="5" style="background-color:#E9E9E9;"|
|- style="font-weight:bold"
| colspan="4" |Source:
|
|}

2018

|-
! colspan=2 style="background-color:#E9E9E9;text-align:left;vertical-align:top;" |Candidate
! style="background-color:#E9E9E9;text-align:left;vertical-align:top;" |Party
! style="background-color:#E9E9E9;text-align:right;" |Votes
! style="background-color:#E9E9E9;text-align:right;" |%
|-
|style="background-color: " |
|align=left|Andrey Kuzmin
|align=left|Liberal Democratic Party
|61,301
|31.64%
|-
|style="background-color: " |
|align=left|Tatyana Rakutina
|align=left|Communist Party
|57,396
|29.62%
|-
|style="background-color: " |
|align=left|Kirill Zimin
|align=left|A Just Russia
|26,170
|13.51%
|-
|style="background-color: " |
|align=left|Gennady Gamza
|align=left|Communists of Russia
|20,556
|10.61%
|-
|style="background-color:" |
|align=left|Galina Nikishina
|align=left|Party of Pensioners
|16,676
|8.61%
|-
| colspan="5" style="background-color:#E9E9E9;" |
|- style="font-weight:bold"
| colspan="3" style="text-align:left;" |Total
|193,742
|100%
|-
| colspan="5" style="background-color:#E9E9E9;" |
|- style="font-weight:bold"
| colspan="4" |Source:
|
|}

2021

|-
! colspan=2 style="background-color:#E9E9E9;text-align:left;vertical-align:top;" |Candidate
! style="background-color:#E9E9E9;text-align:left;vertical-align:top;" |Party
! style="background-color:#E9E9E9;text-align:right;" |Votes
! style="background-color:#E9E9E9;text-align:right;" |%
|-
|style="background-color:"|
|align=left|Vyacheslav Loginov
|align=left|United Russia
|
|32.15%
|-
|style="background-color:"|
|align=left|Roman Kobyzov
|align=left|Communist Party
|
|19.83%
|-
|style="background-color:"|
|align=left|Andrey Kuzmin (incumbent)
|align=left|Liberal Democratic Party
|
|12.25%
|-
|style="background-color: " |
|align=left|Gennady Gamza
|align=left|Communists of Russia
|
|11.20%
|-
|style="background-color: " |
|align=left|Kirill Zimin
|align=left|A Just Russia — For Truth
|
|9.05%
|-
|style="background-color: "|
|align=left|Aleksandr Dodonov
|align=left|New People
|
|6.06%
|-
|style="background-color: "|
|align=left|Andrey Shmoylov
|align=left|Party of Pensioners
|
|3.64%
|-
| colspan="5" style="background-color:#E9E9E9;"|
|- style="font-weight:bold"
| colspan="3" style="text-align:left;" | Total
| 
| 100%
|-
| colspan="5" style="background-color:#E9E9E9;"|
|- style="font-weight:bold"
| colspan="4" |Source:
|
|}

Notes

References

Russian legislative constituencies
Politics of Amur Oblast